Angelelli is a surname. Notable people with the surname include:

Cheryl Angelelli (born 1968), American para-swimmer
Giuseppe Angelelli (1803–1844), Italian painter
Max Angelelli (born 1966), Italian racecar driver
Enrique Angelelli (1923–1976), Argentinian bishop

Italian-language surnames